Mickleton Halt was a railway station on the Great Western Railway line between  and  to serve Mickleton and the surrounding villages. The route is now called the Cotswold Line.

Building of halt was first announced in June 1937. It had two platforms with shelters and cost £512 to build. It was opened on Monday 8 November 1937 with six daily services in each direction on weekdays and an additional service on Saturdays.

The halt was closed on 6 October 1941.

References

Disused railway stations in Gloucestershire
Former Great Western Railway stations
Railway stations in Great Britain opened in 1937
Railway stations in Great Britain closed in 1941
1937 establishments in England
1941 disestablishments in England